Mateo Leš (born 25 March 2000) is a Croatian professional footballer who plays as a defender for Dutch club Heracles Almelo.

Club career
A youth product of Dinamo Zagreb, Leš signed with Heracles Almelo in the Eredivisie in September 2020. He made his professional debut with Heracles Almelo in a 4–0 Eredivisie win over FC Emmen on 12 January 2021.

References

External links
 

2000 births
Living people
Sportspeople from Virovitica
Association football defenders
Croatian footballers
Croatia youth international footballers
GNK Dinamo Zagreb II players
Heracles Almelo players
First Football League (Croatia) players
Eredivisie players
Eerste Divisie players
Croatian expatriate footballers
Expatriate footballers in the Netherlands
Croatian expatriate sportspeople in the Netherlands